Gondia is a taluka in Gondia district of Maharashtra state of Vidharbha India.

Gondia district
There are eight talukas in Gondia district, they are Amgaon), Arjuni-Morgaon, Deori), Gondiya, Goregaon), Sadak-Arjuni, Salekasa, Tirora.

References

Gondia district